Niclas Erlbeck (born 10 January 1993) is a German footballer who plays as a midfielder for FC Energie Cottbus.

Career
On 16 January 2019, Erlbeck joined fourth-tier club Chemnitzer FC from 3. Liga side Carl Zeiss Jena. Six days later, he wanted to leave the club due to personal reasons, and the contract was terminated by mutual consent. Erlbeck was without club until 30 August 2019, where he signed a season-long deal with FC Energie Cottbus.

References

External links
 

1993 births
Living people
Sportspeople from Kassel
German footballers
Association football midfielders
SC Paderborn 07 players
Eintracht Braunschweig II players
FC Carl Zeiss Jena players
Chemnitzer FC players
FC Energie Cottbus players
Regionalliga players
3. Liga players
Footballers from Hesse